Tad Richards Callister (born December 17, 1945) was the 21st Sunday School General President of the Church of Jesus Christ of Latter-day Saints (LDS Church) from 2014 to 2019. He served previously in the church as a general authority from 2008 to 2014, including as a member of the Presidency of the Seventy from 2011 to 2014.

Callister was born in Glendale, California to Effie Norine Richards and Reed Eddington Callister. His parents were both natives of Salt Lake City. Reed Callister served a mission in the United Kingdom for the LDS Church. Callister's mother, Norine, was a daughter of LeGrand Richards, who was the Presiding Bishop of the LDS Church when Callister was born and would later serve as a member of the Quorum of the Twelve Apostles. At the time Callister's parents married in 1932, LeGrand Richards was their stake president in southern California

During the mid-1960s, Callister served as a missionary for the LDS Church in the Eastern Atlantic States Mission, based in Washington, D.C. He holds a bachelor's degree in accounting from Brigham Young University (BYU), a Juris Doctor degree from UCLA, and a master of laws degree from New York University, specializing in tax law.  Callister spent his career as a lawyer in southern California. Callister also served for a time as president of the Verdugo Hills Council of the Boy Scouts of America. Callister was the recipient of the 2019 "Patrons of the Arts" award presented by the Inspirational Arts Association based in Salt Lake City, Utah.

LDS Church service
He previously served in the LDS Church as a bishop, stake president, regional representative, and area seventy. In 2001 Callister helped release a booklet on reaching out to non-members called "Doctrine of Inclusion" and stated, "We're imperfect people...[but] we want it to be said that we're the best neighbors in the world." From 2005 to 2008 he served as president of the church's Canada Toronto East Mission. While still serving in Canada, he was called as a general authority and member of the Second Quorum of the Seventy in 2008. He later served first as a counselor and then as president of the Pacific Area, residing in Auckland and overseeing the operations of the LDS Church in New Zealand, Australia, and the islands of the Pacific. In 2011 he was appointed as a member of the church's seven-man Presidency of the Seventy, replacing Claudio R. M. Costa.

At the church's April 2014 General Conference, Callister was released as a general authority and from the Presidency of the Seventy; the resulting vacancy in the Presidency of the Seventy was filled by Lynn G. Robbins. Callister was simultaneously accepted by the membership as the general president of the church's Sunday School, succeeding Russell T. Osguthorpe. Callister selected John S. Tanner and Devin G. Durrant as his counselors. In 2015, he was quoted on the topics of morality and modesty in The Washington Post.

In May 2015, the church announced that Tanner had been appointed as the next president of Brigham Young University-Hawaii.  As a result, in June 2015 Durrant was called as first counselor, with Brian K. Ashton succeeding Durrant as second counselor. While Callister was serving as Sunday School General President, the church shifted to use of the "Come, Follow Me" curriculum.

Consistent with recent practice of the church's organizational presidencies serving for 5 years, Callister and his counselors were released in April 2019, with Mark L. Pace called as the new Sunday School General President. As with others previously released from the Second Quorum of the Seventy, the church refers to Callister as an emeritus general authority.

Personal life
Callister met his wife, Kathryn Louise Saporiti, while they were students at BYU. They were married in 1968 and are the parents of six children. Her mother was a lifelong member of the church and Kathryn's father, Angelo Louis Saporiti, joined the church while serving in the military in Hawaii some time after he had married. Callister's older brother, Douglas L. Callister, was a member of the Second Quorum of the Seventy from 2000 to 2009.

Bibliography
 
 
 Callister, Tad R. (2015), The Blueprint of Christ's Church, Salt Lake City, Utah: Deseret Book, 
 Callister, Tad R. (2019), A Case for the Book of Mormon, Salt Lake City, Utah: Deseret Book, 
 Callister, Tad R. (2021), America's Choice: A Nation Under God or Without God?, Meadville, PA: Fulton Books,

References

External links
General Authorities and General Officers: Tad R. Callister

1945 births
American general authorities (LDS Church)
Brigham Young University alumni
Living people
Members of the Second Quorum of the Seventy (LDS Church)
New York University School of Law alumni
UCLA School of Law alumni
Presidents of the Seventy (LDS Church)
Area seventies (LDS Church)
Regional representatives of the Twelve
American Mormon missionaries in the United States
American Mormon missionaries in Canada
Mission presidents (LDS Church)
20th-century Mormon missionaries
21st-century Mormon missionaries
California lawyers
People from Glendale, California
Richards–Young family
General Presidents of the Sunday School (LDS Church)
Religious leaders from California
Latter Day Saints from California